Lincoln County is a county located in south-central Kentucky. As of the 2020 census, the population was 24,275. Its county seat is Stanford. Lincoln County is part of the Danville, KY Micropolitan Statistical Area.

History
Lincoln County—originally Lincoln County, Virginia—was established by the Virginia General Assembly in June 1780, and named in honor of Revolutionary War general Benjamin Lincoln. It was one of three counties formed out of Virginia's Kentucky County (The other two were Fayette and Jefferson), and is one of Kentucky's nine original counties.

The county's original seat was at Harrodsburg; but in 1785, Lincoln County was partitioned, and Harrodsburg became the seat of the new Mercer County. Afterward, Stanford became Lincoln County's permanent seat.

Geography

Lincoln County is located in south-central Kentucky astride the southern part of the ring of Knobs, which separate the Bluegrass region from the Eastern Pennyroyal Plateau, the Lincoln County part of which includes the source and headwaters of the Green River. Lincoln County is part of Appalachia.

Adjacent counties
 Boyle County  (northwest)
 Garrard County  (northeast)
 Rockcastle County  (east)
 Pulaski County  (south)
 Casey County  (west)

Demographics

As of the census of 2000, there were 23,361 people, 9,206 households, and 6,729 families residing in the county. The racial makeup of the county was 94.2% White, 2.53% Black or African American, 0.15% Native American, 0.10% Asian, 0.38% from other races, and 0.72% from two or more races. 0.89% of the population were Hispanic or Latino of any race.

There were 9,206 households, out of which 33.70% had children under the age of 18 living with them, 58.60% were married couples living together, 10.30% had a female householder with no husband present, and 26.90% were non-families. 23.60% of all households were made up of individuals, and 10.50% had someone living alone who was 65 years of age or older. The average household size was 2.51 and the average family size was 2.95.

By age, 25.70% of the population was under 18, 8.40% from 18 to 24, 29.80% from 25 to 44, 23.10% from 45 to 64, and 13.10% were 65 or older. The median age was 36 years. For every 100 females, there were 96.30 males. For every 100 females age 18 and over, there were 94.10 males.

The median income for a household in the county was $39,833, and the median income for a family was $32,284. Males had a median income of $26,395 versus $20,517 for females. The per capita income for the county was $13,602. About 16.40% of families and 21.10% of the population were below the poverty line, including 27.10% of those under age 18 and 22.90% of those age 65 or over.

Politics
Lincoln County has been reliably Republican for several decades now, last voting for a Democratic candidate for President in 1976. In 2020, Donald Trump won the highest share of the vote ever for a presidential candidate in the county, garnering 77.8% of the vote.

Communities

Cities
 Crab Orchard
 Eubank (shared with Pulaski County)
 Hustonville
 McKinney, Kentucky
 Stanford (county seat)
 Waynesburg, Kentucky

Census-designated place
 McKinney

Other unincorporated places
 Kings Mountain
 Waynesburg
 Highland
 Preachersville
 Moreland
 Ottenheim
 Halls Gap

See also

 National Register of Historic Places listings in Lincoln County, Kentucky

References

External links

 Lincoln County Kentucky Web Site
 The Kentucky Highlands Project

 
Kentucky counties
Danville, Kentucky micropolitan area
1780 establishments in Virginia
Populated places established in 1780
Former counties of Virginia